Mineville may refer to:

 Mineville, New York, United States
 Mineville, Nova Scotia, Canada
There is a server called "mineville" in Minecraft